Rossit is a surname. Notable people with the surname include:

Desirée Rossit (born 1994), Italian triathlete
Marjolaine Rossit (born 1980), French rower

See also
Rossi (surname)